Cross-Community Labour Alternative is a minor political party founded to contest the 2016 Northern Ireland Assembly election. It stood three candidates in the East Belfast, South Belfast and East Antrim constituencies. It was initiated by the Socialist Party.

Election results
In the 2016 Assembly election, Cross-Community Labour Alternative reached 1939 first-preference votes, having stood 3 candidates. Conor Sheridan polled 551 first preference votes (1.7%) in East Antrim, Sean Burns got 871 first preferences (2.7%) in Belfast South and Courtney Robinson got 517 first preferences (1.4%) in Belfast East.

In the 2017 election, the CCLA stood four candidates, in the same three constituencies as before, and also in Fermanagh and South Tyrone. They won no seats and a slightly increased first-preference vote, with 2,009 votes (0.3%).

In the 2019 Northern Ireland local elections, one of the party's candidates, Donal O'Cofaigh, was elected to Fermanagh and Omagh District Council. During the split in the Socialist Party in 2019, O'Cofaigh joined the minority Irish section of the Committee for a Workers' International (2019), which renamed itself Militant Left in June 2020. In the 2022 Assembly election CCLA ran O'Cofaigh as the party's only candidate.

Northern Ireland Assembly

References

2016 establishments in the United Kingdom
Anti-austerity political parties in the United Kingdom
Political parties established in 2016
Labour parties in Northern Ireland
Socialist parties in Ireland
Socialist parties in the United Kingdom
Socialist Party (Ireland)